Airiel is an American shoegaze band from Chicago, Illinois, United States. Bandleader Jeremy Wrenn described Airiel's music by saying, "It's loud, it’s pretty and you can dance to it".

History
Airiel was formed as Airiel Project One in 1997, in Bloomington, Indiana, by guitarist/vocalist Jeremy Wrenn and former bandmate Shawn Delaney. This followed the breakup of Wrenn's previous shoegaze band, Black Olive, who had released one album, Verge. After shortening their name to Airiel, their debut single, "Shirley Temple Tidal Wave", was released in 1999 by Roisin Recordings.

During 2003–2004, the band released a series of four Winks & Kisses EPs on Clairecords, each containing four songs. The EPs were later reissued as a box set, also titled Winks and Kisses.

In 2005, Airiel released a self-titled EP on Sonicbaby Records, and toured the eastern United States.

In 2007, the band recorded their debut full-length studio album, The Battle of Sealand, which was released on Highwheel Records that August 21. In honor of their contribution to the culture of the Principality of Sealand, a micronation, all the members of the band were named official lords of Sealand, and were invited to be the first rock band to play a concert in the nation, to be broadcast live over the internet. However, this concert did not take place.

Bassist/vocalist Cory Osborne and drummer John Rungger left the band in late 2007, and Airiel relocated to Bridgeport, a neighborhood on Chicago's South Side.

Airiel toured the UK and Ireland in April 2008 with Ulrich Schnauss, who had collaborated with the band on The Battle of Sealand track "Sugar Crystals".

After signing with Shelflife Records in 2011, Airiel returned in 2012 with the Kid Games EP.

On March 10, 2017, the "Cloudburst" single was issued. Their second studio album, Molten Young Lovers, was released by Shelflife on October 13, 2017.

The band, now the duo of Wrenn and Andrew Marrah, self-released the single "Bloom" on September 4, 2020, for Bandcamp Friday. The song is lead track from their forthcoming EP.

Members
Current
Jeremy Wrenn – vocals, guitar
Andrew Marrah – guitar, synthesizers, programming

Former
Chris DeBrizzio – guitar
Mikey Pinaud – drums
Cory Osborne – bass, vocals
Chase Johnson - bass, synthesizers
Andrew Puricelli – bass, vocals
John Rungger – drums
Zeeshan Abbasi – guitar
Adam Reade Thompson - Guitar
Matt Blanton – bass guitar
Spencer Kiss – drums, synthesizers
Nick Bertling - drums, bass
Shawn Delaney - bass, vocals

Discography

Studio albums
The Battle of Sealand (2007, Highwheel Records)
Molten Young Lovers (2017, Shelflife Records)

EPs
Christmas Colors (2002, Sonic Syrup)  
Winks & Kisses: Frosted (2003, Clairecords)  
Winks & Kisses: Dizzy (2003, Clairecords)   
Winks & Kisses: Melted (2004, Clairecords)    
Winks & Kisses: Crackled (2004, Clairecords)   
Airiel (2005, Sonicbaby Records)
Kid Games (2012, Shelflife Records)

Singles
"Shirley Temple Tidal Wave" 7" (1999, Roisin Recordings)  
"In Your Room" 8" (2004, Sonic Syrup)  
"Cloudburst" digital (2017, Shelflife Records)
"Bloom" digital (2020, Self-Released)

Compilation albums
Winks & Kisses box set (2004, Clairecords)

Compilation appearances
"Blowin' Cool" (Swervedriver cover) on Never Lose That Feeling Volume One (2005, Club AC30)

References

External links
Airiel's official site
Airiel's Myspace site
Airiel's Bandcamp site

American shoegaze musical groups
Dream pop musical groups
American experimental rock groups
Musical groups from Chicago